"Vattene amore" is a 1990 song composed by Amedeo Minghi, Pasquale Panella and Augusto Martelli and recorded in a duo performance by  Mietta and Minghi.  The song premiered at the 40th edition of the Sanremo Music Festival, where it placed third. During the festival, it was also performed in an English-language adaptation titled "All for the Love" by Nikka Costa. 
 
The song was an immediate hit, topping the Italian singles chart for several weeks.

Lyrics
The song is a classic piece of love, characterized by a strong vocal chiaroscurism.
The text describes the difficulties of a couple separated by the numerous trips of him, using a very idiomatic language.
If words were to be literally translated into a different language (like English), several non-sense could be in place.

The song has a very original and appealing melody and jingle ("dudu dadada"), which remained famous in Italy for many years especially among lovers who started referring to him as "trottolino" (that means my baby, honey, sweetheart, my dear).

Charts
 

 Amedeo Minghi & Viktor Lazlo version (1993)

Year-end charts

References

1990 songs
1990 singles
Italian pop songs
Sanremo Music Festival songs
Number-one singles in Italy